Pteroneta is a genus of sac spiders first described by Christa L. Deeleman-Reinhold in 2001.

Species
 it contains eight species:
Pteroneta baiteta Versteirt, Deeleman-Reinhold & Baert, 2008 – New Guinea
Pteroneta brevichela Versteirt, Deeleman-Reinhold & Baert, 2008 – New Guinea
Pteroneta longichela Versteirt, Deeleman-Reinhold & Baert, 2008 – New Guinea
Pteroneta madangiensis Versteirt, Deeleman-Reinhold & Baert, 2008 – New Guinea
Pteroneta saltans Deeleman-Reinhold, 2001 (type) – Malaysia, Indonesia (Sulawesi, Lesser Sunda Is.), Borneo
Pteroneta spinosa Raven & Stumkat, 2002 – Australia (Queensland)
Pteroneta tertia Deeleman-Reinhold, 2001 – Singapore, Indonesia (Borneo, Sulawesi)
Pteroneta ultramarina (Ono, 1989) – Japan (Ryukyu Is.)

References

Araneomorphae genera
Clubionidae
Spiders of Asia
Spiders of Australia